Tolumnia variegata, the harlequin dancing-lady orchid, is a species of orchid endemic to the Caribbean. It is the most widespread species of the genus, ranging from the Virgin Islands in the eastern Caribbean westward to Puerto Rico, Hispaniola, Cuba and the Cayman Islands. Plants occur mostly on small branches of shrubs and small trees, often in secondary habitats, in dry to wet regions from near sea level to 800 m elevation. It is not found in Jamaica.

References

External links

variegata